Purushottam Bhaskar Bhave (Devanagari: पुरुषोत्तम भास्कर भावे) (12 April 1910 – 13 August 1980)  was a Marathi writer from Maharashtra, India.

Bhave lost his mother when he was just nine years old. His father Bhaskar Haree Bhave was a military doctor. Bhave and his brother were taken by his maternal grandparents to Malakapur, where they grew up. Bhave was never on good terms with his father, a strict disciplinarian who threw him out of home at least twice.

He received his college education at Hislop College and Law College in Nagpur. Bhave was a fiery political activist of the right-wing, Hindu (हिंदुत्ववादी) persuasion.

In the 1930s, he ran in Nagpur periodicals "Savdhan" (सावधान) and "Adesh" (आदेश), promoting his political views. Immediately after partition Bhave had been to riots affected Noakhali in East Bengal. He stayed there for about six months and maintained a diary interviewing riot affected people. It was his wish to publish it, but he could not publish it. Bhave was prosecuted for being responsible for Bhiwandi riots by Government of Maharashtra. But he fought the case with the help of Ramakant Ovalekar, a senior lawyer, and won the case. Being activist of Right wing, he was almost boycotted by the government forever.

He wrote scripts of some Marathi movies like Rayagadcha Rajabandi and played small roles in movies like Ammaldar. He was a close friend of Raja Badhe, Gajanan Digambar Madgulkar, Vyankatesh Madgulkar and Govinrao Talawalkar. In fact, Gajanan Digambar Madgulkar used to call him his 'Guru'. Gajanan Digambar Madgulkar was an established poet in Marathi literature. Vyankatesh Madgulkar, his younger brother was a story writer and was a very close friend to Bhave. Bhave edited and published a book of short stories named 'Thorali pati' (which means Bada Bhai), written by Gajanan Madgulkar who, by that time, did not publish his short stories as he was already a known poet.

Bhave was elected president of Marathi Sahitya Sammelan in Pune in 1977. He was elected president of Natya Sammelan in Nagar.

Authorship

Bhave wrote 17 novels, 8 plays, 2 screen scripts, 26 collections of his short stories, and 12 collections of his essays. The following is a partial list of his books:

 Rakta Ani Ashru (Collection of political essays)
 Viththala Panduranga (Collection of essays)
 Akulina (Novel)
 Vyaadh (Novel)
 Darshan (Novel)
 Mage Walun (Novel)
 Warshawa (Novel)
 Adich Akshare (Novel)
 Don Bhinti (Novel)
 Wishakanya (Play)
 Maharani (Play)
 Padmini (Play)
 Swamini (Play)
 Mukti
 Pratham-Purushi Ek-Wachani (Three-part autobiography)
 परंपरा  (Collection of short stories)
 प्रतारणा (Collection of short stories)
 सार्थक (Collection of short stories)
 साडी  (Collection of short stories)
 ठरीव ठशाची गोष्ट (Collection of short stories)
 satarave varsha (Laghu katha)
 rakhamachya muli {novel}
 Pingat petiche rahasya {vinodi katha

References

 Laghu Katha

1910 births
1980 deaths
Marathi-language writers
Writers from Pune
Writers from Nagpur
20th-century Indian short story writers
20th-century Indian dramatists and playwrights
20th-century Indian novelists
20th-century Indian essayists
Dramatists and playwrights from Maharashtra
Novelists from Maharashtra
Presidents of the Akhil Bharatiya Marathi Sahitya Sammelan